Podosphaeraster is a genus of echinoderms belonging to the monotypic family Podosphaerasteridae.

The species of this genus are found in Europe, Malesia, Australia.

Species:

Podosphaeraster gustavei 
Podosphaeraster polyplax 
Podosphaeraster pulvinatus 
Podosphaeraster somnambulator 
Podosphaeraster thalassae 
Podosphaeraster toyoshiomaruae

References

Valvatida
Asteroidea genera